is a Japanese actress, tarento and fashion model who is represented with Lucolort.

Biography
In April 2011, Kurosaki made her debut in the drama Hagane no Onna season 2.
Kurosaki worked as an exclusive model for the fashion magazine Nicola from December 2011 (the January 2012 issue) to April 2015 (the May 2015 issue). She only appeared in the cover once. She later worked as an exclusive model for the fashion magazine Seventeen from August 2015 (the September 2015 issue) to March 2018 (the May 2018 issue).
Kurosaki's hobbies are drawing manga and singing songs. Her special skill is drawing illustrations.
Kurosaki's favourite film is Iron Man and her favourite novel is Baccano!

Filmography

TV dramas

Films

Advertisements

Music videos

Bibliography

Magazine serialisations

See also
List of Japanese actresses

References

External links
  
 

Actors from Aichi Prefecture
1998 births
Living people
Japanese television actresses
Japanese female models